Preston Michael Claiborne (born January 21, 1988) is an American former professional baseball pitcher. He played in Major League Baseball (MLB) for the New York Yankees and Texas Rangers. He attended Tulane University, where he played college baseball for the Tulane Green Wave.

Career

Amateur
Claiborne attended Newman Smith High School in Carrollton, Texas, where he played for the school's baseball team. Selected in the 23rd round of the 2006 Major League Baseball draft by the Pittsburgh Pirates, Claiborne did not sign, opting to attend Tulane University to play for the Tulane Green Wave baseball team. At Tulane, he was used as a relief pitcher, appearing in a total of 84 games from 2007 through 2010. In 2007 and 2008, he played collegiate summer baseball with the Falmouth Commodores of the Cape Cod Baseball League.

New York Yankees
The New York Yankees selected Claiborne in the 17th round of the 2010 Major League Baseball draft. He signed and reported to the Staten Island Yankees of the Class A-Short Season New York–Penn League. He was promoted to the Tampa Yankees of the Class A-Advanced Florida State League that year, in time to pitch for Tampa in the league's playoffs. He returned to Tampa in 2011.

Claiborne started the 2012 season with the Trenton Thunder of the Class AA Eastern League, and made 20 appearances for the Scranton/Wilkes-Barre Yankees of the Class AAA International League that year.

Claiborne began the 2013 season with the Scranton/Wilkes-Barre RailRiders, and was called up to the majors for the first time on May 3, 2013, when the Yankees placed Joba Chamberlain on the disabled list. He made his major league debut on May 5, 2013, against the Oakland Athletics. During his debut, he pitched two scoreless innings without allowing a baserunner.

Claiborne was optioned down to Scranton/Wilkes-Barre on August 16, 2013.  He was then recalled to be the 26th player for a doubleheader against the Toronto Blue Jays on August 20 but was optioned back to Scranton/Wilkes-Barre right after the second game. However, he was brought back up on August 22 when infielder Jayson Nix was placed on the disabled list.

Claiborne was optioned back to Triple-A on August 26 when the Yankees activated Derek Jeter from the disabled list. He was then brought back up to the Yankees on September 2 after the rosters expanded on September 1, 2013. The Yankees designated Claiborne for assignment on December 19, 2014.

Miami Marlins
Claiborne was claimed off waivers by the Miami Marlins on December 23, 2014. He missed the entire 2015 season with a shoulder injury. On March 17, 2016, Claiborne was released by the Marlins.

San Francisco Giants
On May 16, 2016, Claiborne signed a minor league deal with the San Francisco Giants.

Texas Rangers
On February 24, 2017, Claiborne signed a minor league deal with the Texas Rangers. He was promoted to the major league roster on June 22. He was designated for assignment on July 2, 2017.

Cleveland Indians
On January 26, 2018, he signed a minor league deal with the Cleveland Indians. He became a free agent after the season.

Personal
The first time Claiborne attended a baseball game, which featured the visiting Yankees playing the Texas Rangers, his father encouraged him to play with the "class and respect" of a Yankee. His father died of a stroke during Claiborne's sophomore year at Tulane. He contributes to a website, TheCupCheck.com, which is run by minor league baseball players to give other minor leaguers tips on how to handle life in professional baseball. The Wall Street Journal called Claiborne "one of the site's most prolific contributors."

References

External links

Tulane Green Wave bio

1988 births
Living people
Baseball players from Dallas
Major League Baseball pitchers
New York Yankees players
Texas Rangers players
Tulane Green Wave baseball players
Falmouth Commodores players
Staten Island Yankees players
Tampa Yankees players
Phoenix Desert Dogs players
Indios de Mayagüez players
Trenton Thunder players
Gulf Coast Yankees players
Scranton/Wilkes-Barre Yankees players
Scranton/Wilkes-Barre RailRiders players
Richmond Flying Squirrels players
Toros del Este players
American expatriate baseball players in the Dominican Republic
Round Rock Express players
Columbus Clippers players
Arizona League Indians players
Akron RubberDucks players